Peter Houseman House is a historic home located at Westerleigh, Staten Island, New York.  It consists of two sections, one built about 1730 and the second about 1760.  The older section is a -story, stone wing built of fieldstone painted white.  The newer section is a -story, large frame section with a gable roof.

It was added to the National Register of Historic Places in 1982.

References

Houses on the National Register of Historic Places in Staten Island
Houses completed in 1730